Ristović is a Serbian patronymic surname derived from a masculine given name Risto. It may refer to:

Ana Ristović (born 1972), Serbian poet and translator
Milan Ristović (born 1953), historian
Nikolina Ristović (born 1976), television presenter
Predrag Ristović (born 1975), footballer
Risto Ristović (born 1988), footballer

Serbian surnames